Fuel is any material that can release energy, especially by burning.

Fuel may also refer to:

Music
Fuel (band), an American post-grunge band from Pennsylvania
Fuel (hardcore band), an American post-hardcore trio from California
Fuel (Larry Young album), 1975
Fuel, an album by Raised Fist, 1998
Fuel (EP), by Fuel, 1994
The Fuel, an EP by Koncept and J57, 2015
"Fuel" (song), by Metallica, 1998

Science and technology
FUEL (Firefox User Extension Library), a JavaScript library
Fuel (journal), a scientific journal covering fuel research
SGI Fuel, a workstation

Other uses
Fuel (film), a 2008 documentary film
Fuel (video game), a 2009 racing game
Fuel Industries, a defunct Canadian online interactive and marketing agency
Fuel TV (disambiguation), several television sports channels
Dallas Fuel, an American esports team in the Overwatch League